This is a list of assassinations in Albania from the year 1913 to present day. Included in the list are public figures and other prominent individuals who were active in Albanian politics and daily life. Also included are assassinations that took place outside the present day borders of Albania. Not included are those who died as casualties of war or were killed by the State.

Assassinations (1913–present)

Murders by the numbers  
Number of people murdered in Albania since 1990.

References 

 
Albania
Assassinated politicians